Fair Park was a ballpark located in Tyler, TX and home to the Texas League Tyler Sports for only one season in 1932.

1932 Shreveport/Tyler Sports
During the 1932 season, the park of the Shreveport Sports of the Texas League burned down, causing the team to move to Tyler, Texas, and become the Tyler Sports. The team played its games at Fair Park but folded after the season.

The franchise moved to Tyler from Shreveport on May 16. The team finished with a 57-93 overall record (48-72 after the move).

Sources
 "Baseball in the Lone Star State: Texas League's Greatest Hits," Tom Kayser and David King, Trinity University Press 2005

References

Baseball venues in East Texas
Baseball venues in Texas
History of Tyler, Texas